KPOD-FM (97.9 FM) is a radio station broadcasting a country music format. Licensed to Crescent City, California, United States, the station serves the Crescent City area.  The station is currently owned by Bicoastal Media Licenses II, LLC and features programming from ABC Radio and Jones Radio Network.

History
The station went on the air as KTGK on 1987-12-08.  On 1988-02-04, the station changed its call sign to the current KPOD.

References

External links

POD-FM
Crescent City, California